Santa Comba de Rossas is a civil parish in the municipality of Bragança, Portugal. The population in 2011 was 304, in an area of 8.75 km².

References

Parishes of Bragança, Portugal